Lierposten is a Norwegian weekly newspaper published on Thursdays in Lier in Buskerud county. The newspaper was established in 1987 and is owned by Amedia. It is politically independent. Its editor and manager is Pål A. Næss.

Circulation
According to the Norwegian Media Businesses' Association, Lierposten has had the following annual circulation:
 2006: 3,315
 2007: 3,382
 2008: 3,373
 2009: 3,340
 2010: 3,405
 2011: 3,382
 2012: 3,368
 2013: 3,498
 2014: 3,302
 2015: 3,134
 2016: 3,126
 2017: 3,038
 2018: 2,932
 2019: 2,817

References

External links

1987 establishments in Norway
Amedia
Mass media in Buskerud
Newspapers established in 1987
Norwegian-language newspapers
Weekly newspapers published in Norway